The 2006 United States Senate election in Tennessee was held on November 7, 2006. Incumbent Republican Senator Bill Frist, the Majority Leader, retired after two terms in office. The open seat was won by Republican nominee Bob Corker, who defeated Democratic nominee Harold Ford Jr.  

The race between Ford and Corker was one of the most competitive Senate races of 2006, with Corker winning the race by less than three percent of the vote. Corker was the only non-incumbent Republican to win a U.S. Senate seat in 2006.  Since 1994, the Republican Party has held both of Tennessee's U.S. Senate seats.

Since this election (along with the gubernatorial election held the same day), only seven of the state's 95 counties–Davidson, Shelby, Haywood, Hardeman, Houston, Jackson, and Lake–have gone to the Democratic candidate in a statewide election, with Jackson and Lake only going Democratic once. Only five counties have voted for a Democratic candidate in a Presidential, Senate, or gubernatorial race multiple times since 2006. Only three–Davidson, Shelby, and Haywood–have voted Democratic in a Senate race since 2006. 

The election marks the last very competitive statewide election in Tennessee history, as the Republican Party has gained intense strength in both Tennessee and predominantly white, rural Southeast regions that were usually Democratic-leaning outside of presidential elections.

Democratic primary

Candidates 
 Harold Ford Jr., U.S. Representative

Campaign 
Harold Ford was a Congressman from the 9th Congressional District, based in Memphis, and he was a member of a political family, with many relatives also serving or formerly in political office. He was known nationally for his keynote address at the 2000 Democratic National Convention in Los Angeles, and for a challenge to Nancy Pelosi for leadership of the House Democrats in 2002. He had also served as a national campaign co-chair for the John Kerry presidential campaign in 2004.

Ford filed paperwork to run for the U.S. Senate in May 2005.

Democratic State Senator Rosalind Kurita, from the 22nd District, centered on Clarksville, Tennessee had entered the race prior to Ford, and initially appeared to be competitive, releasing internal polls showing her as strong as Ford in the general election. But she dropped out of the race in early April 2006, as a result of financial and organizational challenges.

Ford enjoyed substantial support from Democratic leaders in Washington and Nashville and held a substantial lead in fundraising.

Results

Republican primary

Candidates 
 Ed Bryant, former U.S. Representative
 Bob Corker, businessman and former Mayor of Chattanooga
 Van Hilleary, former U.S. Representative and nominee for Governor of Tennessee in 2002

Campaign 

Only 11 percent of Tennesseans knew who Corker was when he began running for the Senate race. All three have run statewide campaigns in the past, albeit unsuccessful ones: Bryant for the 2002 Republican Senate nomination, losing to Lamar Alexander; Corker for the U.S. Senate in 1994, losing to Frist in the Republican primary; and Hilleary for Tennessee Governor in 2002, losing to Democrat Phil Bredesen.

Debates 
The three Republican candidates met for a debate at the University of Tennessee campus in Knoxville on June 29, 2006.  All three candidates expressed skepticism regarding global warming and recent publication of scientific consensus on the issue, supported continued American involvement in Iraq, opposed income tax increases, and "showed varying degrees of interest in replacing the federal income tax with a national sales tax," prompting Corker to state in his closing statement "[t]here's not any difference, that I can tell, on the issues."

Polling

Results

General election

Candidates

Major 
 Harold Ford Jr. (D), U.S. Representative
 Bob Corker (R), former Mayor of Chattanooga

Minor 
 Ed Choate (I) 
 Gary Keplinger (I)
 Bo Heyward (I)
 Chris Lugo (G), peace activist
 David "None of the Above" Gatchell (I)

Campaign 

Not long after Corker's primary victory was assured, Ford, at a rally of his supporters attended by Bill Clinton, challenged Corker to seven televised debates across the state.  In response, Corker said he will debate Ford but did not agree to Ford's request of seven debates.  Both of Corker's primary opponents endorsed Corker immediately after they conceded the race.

On August 8, 2006, the Tennessee Democratic Party filed a complaint with the Federal Election Commission against Corker for allegedly violating campaign financial disclosure rules.

On August 25, the Chattanooga Times Free Press reported that Corker had received a subpoena regarding an environmental lawsuit filed three years ago.  The lawsuit centers on the actions Corker took as mayor to allegedly demolish a conservation site to build a road that leads to a Wal-Mart SuperCenter.  Corker was scheduled to testify on October 18, but the case was settled on October 13.

Ford, a member of the Blue Dog Coalition in Congress, sought to run as a centrist, recognizing that Tennessee was a conservative state. While he was a member of a political dynasty in Memphis, this also served as a liability, as his state senator uncle was indicted on federal corruption charges the day after he announced his Senate candidacy.

On October 1, Corker replaced his campaign manager.

As the campaign entered October, Ford was leading in some polls. Despite running a strong campaign, he was hampered by his family's legal issues and the fact that his base was in West Tennessee, as opposed to Corker's base in East Tennessee.

Before a Corker press conference in Memphis on October 20, Ford approached Corker in a parking lot and confronted his opponent about Iraq in front of local news cameras, pointing out that some of Corker's fellow Republicans are changing their minds on the war and wanting to debate him about the issue.  In response, Corker said, "I came to talk about ethics, and I have a press conference. And I think it's a true sign of desperation that you would pull your bus up when I'm having a press conference."  Ford replied that he could never find Corker.  Corker then walked away to his press conference.

On November 2, Nielsen Monitor Plus indicated that the Corker campaign had purchased more television advertising than any other Senate candidate in the country through October 15.

Debates 
3 debates were held between Corker and Ford. They participated in a televised debate in Memphis on October 7, in Chattanooga on October 10, and in Nashville on October 28.

In the October 7, 2006 debate in Memphis, the candidates covered a wide range of issues, including immigration, Iraq, cutting health care costs, abortion, and Social Security.  Commenting on Ford's political family, Corker said, "I think it's evident there's been a Ford in this (9th District congressional district) seat for 32 years, and if you look at the number of Fords that are on the ballot—especially I think the most recent one, I know it concerns a lot of people right here in Memphis."  Ford responded, "I don't know why Mr. Corker keeps bringing up my family. . . . It's you and I running for the Senate. It's our ideas, our plans to make the future better for everybody. Let's stick to you and I. And if you come up with a recipe to pick family, say it. Otherwise be quiet and let's run for the Senate."
Complete video of debate, October 7, 2006

The October 10 Chattanooga debate covered many of the same issues, with Corker again attempting to make Ford's family an issue and Ford claiming that Corker would be merely a "rubber stamp" for the Bush administration and Republican Party in the Senate.
Complete video of debate, October 10, 2006

The final debate took place on October 28, in Nashville and mostly covered the economy.
Complete video of debate, October 28, 2006

Controversial advertisement 

A negative ad titled "Who Hasn't?" sponsored by the Republican National Committee ("RNC") that aired during the third and fourth weeks of October gained national attention and was condemned by both Ford and Corker.  The ad ridiculed Ford through interviews of fictional citizens giving deadpan endorsements that satirized Ford's policies and reputation, such as "terrorists need their privacy" and "taxes after I'm dead". The last of these is a scantily clad white woman (Johanna Goldsmith) acting as a Playboy bunny who "met Harold at the Playboy party", who invites Ford to "call me".

Responding to questions about the ad, a Ford spokesperson said that Ford went to a 2005 Playboy-sponsored Super Bowl party that was attended by more than 3,000 people, and Ford himself said that he likes "football and girls" and makes no apology for either.

The NAACP described the ad as "a powerful innuendo that plays to pre-existing prejudices about African-American men and white women", and a former Republican Senator called it "a very serious appeal to a racist sentiment.  Corker condemned the RNC ad, calling it "tacky" and stating that his campaign has asked to have it pulled.  The RNC, however, continued to endorse the ad, said it had no plans to stop airing it, and dismissed charges of racism, saying it "wouldn't even entertain the premise" that the ad was racist.  In an October 24 interview with Tim Russert, RNC chairman Ken Mehlman said that he thought the ad was "fair" and that he did not have the authority to pull it.

The ad was also denounced by Canada's ambassador to the United States, Michael Wilson, and in the Parliament of Canada by MP Omar Alghabra.  The ad became an issue in Canada because of an actor's statement in the advertisement, "Canada can take care of North Korea. They’re not busy."  Alghabra, in the House of Commons, responded, "Is this what Canadians should be expecting as the outcome of cozying up to Mr. Bush by the prime minister and his Conservatives?"

On October 25, Mehlman announced that the ad was "down now" during an interview with Wolf Blitzer on CNN.  In its place, Tennessee television stations ran a different RNC ad.

Endorsements 
Ford received endorsements from, among others, The Tennessean (Nashville's predominant daily newspaper), The Commercial Appeal (Memphis's predominant daily newspaper), the Jackson Sun (Jackson's predominant daily newspaper), the Bristol Herald Courier, Metro Pulse (Knoxville), the Professional Firefighters Association of Tennessee, and the Tennessee State Lodge of the Fraternal Order of Police.

Corker was endorsed by, among others, the National Rifle Association, the Knoxville News-Sentinel, the United States Chamber of Commerce, Clarksville Leaf Chronicle, Lebanon Democrat, Kingsport Times News, Nashville City Paper, the National Federation of Independent Businesses, and the National Right to Life Committee, though the Tennessee Right to Life Committee has refused to endorse Corker, claiming he is a "pro-abortion" politician.

Both Corker and Ford were endorsed by the Chattanooga Times Free Press (Chattanooga's predominant daily newspaper still maintains two separate editorial pages left over from when its two daily newspapers merged): Ford by The Times editors, and Corker by Free Press editors.

Fundraising 
Through October 18, 2006, Corker had raised more money than Ford and had also spent more, according to the candidates' most recent filings with the Federal Election Commission (FEC).  Corker tapped into his personal fortune to help fund his campaign, loaning his campaign a total of $4.1 million.  Corker loaned $2 million of this amount on Wednesday, November 1, less than a week before the election, triggering the "millionaire's amendment" of the 2002 Campaign Reform Act and allowing Ford to seek $12,600 from individual donors instead of $2,100, the normal limit, for the final days of the campaign.

President Bush attended two fund raiser dinners on behalf of the Corker campaign in Nashville and Memphis which raised $2.6 million for Corker's campaign by charging over $2,000 a plate. Former President Bill Clinton attended a rally for the Ford campaign in Nashville that raised about $1 million.

None of the third party candidates filed reports with the FEC.

Predictions

Polling 
In the general election, polls showed Corker with a statistically insignificant lead in the week before the election.

Results

See also 
 2006 United States Senate elections

References

External links 
 Bob Corker's Campaign Site
 Harold Ford, Jr.'s Campaign Site
 
 Democrats' Senate Hopes May Ride on Tennessee, by Robin Toner, The New York Times, May 31, 2006
 Dems pin hopes on candidate who's no liberal, by Zachary Coile, San Francisco Chronicle, September 17, 2006
  Senate race is looming large, by Rebecca Ferrar, Knoxville News-Sentinel, September 24, 2006
 New Hope for Democrats in Bid for Senate, by Robin Toner, The New York Times, September 28, 2006
 A photo finish in Corker-Ford race?, by Richard Locker, The Commercial Appeal, October 1, 2006
 Bob Corker's questionnaire responses from The Commercial Appeal
 Harold Ford Jr's questionnaire responses from The Commercial Appeal

Tennessee
2006
United States Senate